William Peter Fleckenstein (November 4, 1903 – January 25, 1967) was an American professional football player who was a guard in the National Football League (NFL) for seven seasons with the Chicago Bears, the Portsmouth Spartans, the Brooklyn Dodgers, and the Frankford Yellow Jackets.

In March 1934, he married the actress Mildred Harris, who was previously married to Charlie Chaplin, with whom he lived until her death in 1944.

On April 9, 1946, he married Esther Louise Priebe. They lived in Hollywood, California. They had three children (John William, Cheryl Ann, and Julie Jane).

References

1903 births
1967 deaths
American football guards
Brooklyn Dodgers (NFL) players
Carleton Knights football players
Chicago Bears players
Frankford Yellow Jackets players
Iowa Hawkeyes football players
Portsmouth Spartans players
People from Faribault, Minnesota
Players of American football from Minnesota